Corrimbla or Corimla is an area approximately  east/north-east of Ballina, County Mayo in Ireland. It comprises two townlands, Corimla North and Corimla South.

The north side (Corimla North) is sparsely populated and inhabited by about 30 people. The south side (Corimla South, along the Bonniconlon road) has up to 70 people living in the area. The Little Brosna River and Glenree River pass through the townland.

References

Townlands of County Mayo